Proliga is the Indonesian professional top level competition for volleyball clubs. It is organised by Persatuan Bola Voli Seluruh Indonesia (PBVSI) or Indonesian Volleyball Association.  It was founded in 2002.

Honours

Champions

Titles by clubs

See also
Indonesian men's Proliga

References

External links
 Official Site
 Volimania Indonesia

Volleyball
Indonesia
Volleyball in Indonesia
Sports leagues established in 2002
2002 establishments in Indonesia
Professional sports leagues in Indonesia